Robert Brdar (born 3 April 1995) is a Croatian football midfielder who currently plays for Vinodol.

References

External links
PrvaLiga profile 

1995 births
Living people
Footballers from Rijeka
Association football midfielders
Croatian footballers
NK Zavrč players
NK Grobničan players
NK Novigrad players
HNK Orijent players
NK Krk players
NK Lučko players
Slovenian PrvaLiga players
First Football League (Croatia) players
Croatian expatriate footballers
Expatriate footballers in Slovenia
Croatian expatriate sportspeople in Slovenia